Henderson is a hamlet and census-designated place (CDP) in the town of Henderson, Jefferson County, New York, United States. The population of the CDP was 224 at the 2010 census, out of 1,360 in the entire town of Henderson.

Geography
The hamlet of Henderson is located in southwestern Jefferson County, in the center of the town of Henderson. The community is in the valley of Stony Creek, a southwestward-flowing tributary of Lake Ontario. New York State Route 178 runs through the center of the community, leading west  to New York State Route 3 and southeast  to Adams.

Demographics

References

Hamlets in New York (state)
Census-designated places in New York (state)
Census-designated places in Jefferson County, New York
Hamlets in Jefferson County, New York